The One Tower is a skyscraper located in the city of Balneário Camboriú in southern Brazil. Completed in December 2022, it is the tallest building in the country and the second tallest skyscraper in South America, at 290 meters (951 feet) tall.

See also 

 List of tallest buildings in Brazil
 List of tallest buildings

References

External links 

 One Tower - FG enterprises

Skyscrapers in Brazil